Dhanya is a 1981 Indian Malayalam-language film written and directed by Fazil and produced by Boban Kunchacko. The film stars Srividya, Mohanlal, Jagathy Sreekumar, and Nedumudi Venu. The musical score was composed by Jerry Amaldev.
It was the debut film of Kunchako Boban, who appears in a minor role as a child.

Cast
Srividya
Sarath Babu
Mohanlal
Jagathy Sreekumar
Nedumudi Venu
Alummoodan
Aranmula Ponnamma
Kunchacko Boban as child
Meena Menon
Mohan Jose
Rajesh Nandan

Soundtrack
The music was composed by Shyam and lyrics was written by Sreekumaran Thampi .

References

External links
 

1981 films
1980s Malayalam-language films
Films directed by Fazil